The  is a type of 4-6-2 steam locomotive built by Kisha Seizo Mitsubishi and Japanese National Railways (JNR) Hamamatsu Works . The C classification indicates three sets of driving wheels. The C51 introduced  diameter driving wheels to Japan.

China Railway class SL9
 
To alleviate a severe motive power shortage, sixteen JGR Class C51 locomotives, C51 8, 28, 30, 33 - 35, 88, 95, 96, 116, 130 - 132, 173, 175, and 178, all equipped with a Sumiyama feedwater heater, were converted to standard gauge and sent to the Central China Railway in 1939, where they operated primarily between Nanjing and Shanghai, at first with their original JGR numbers, later as パシナ (Pashina) class. After the Liberation of China and the establishment of the People's Republic, these became China Railway class ㄆㄒ9 (PX9) in 1951, and reclassified as class SL9 (勝利9, Shènglì, "victory") in 1959.

Preserved examples
As of 2012, four Class C51 locomotives were preserved at various locations.

 C51 5: At the Railway Museum in Saitama, Saitama (formerly preserved outdoors at the Ome Railway Park in Ome, Tokyo
 C51 44: At Akita Depot in Akita, Akita
 C51 85: At Kagoshima Depot in Kagoshima, Kagoshima
 C51 239: At the Umekoji Steam Locomotive Museum in Kyoto

See also
 Japan Railways locomotive numbering and classification
JGR Class 8900
JNR Class C52

References

Railway locomotives introduced in 1919
4-6-2 locomotives
Steam locomotives of Japan
1067 mm gauge locomotives of Japan
Steam locomotives of China
Standard gauge locomotives of China
Passenger locomotives